Nupserha lenita is a species of beetle in the family Cerambycidae. It was described by Francis Polkinghorne Pascoe in 1867. It is known from Myanmar, India, Thailand, Malaysia, and Vietnam.

Varietas
 Nupserha lenita var. bilatevittata Breuning, 1950
 Nupserha lenita var. siamensis Breuning, 1955
 Nupserha lenita var. ambigena Lameere, 1893
 Nupserha lenita var. annamensis Pic, 1939
 Nupserha lenita var. sikkimensis Breuning, 1960

References

lenita
Beetles described in 1867